Roach is an unincorporated community in southern Camden County, Missouri, United States. It is located north of U.S. Route 54 on Missouri Route AA, approximately five miles west of Camdenton and 2.5 miles west of the Niangua River arm of the Lake of the Ozarks.  The ZIP Code for Roach is 65787.

The community was named after the Roach family of pioneer settlers who were hardy in nature and would not die under very harsh circumstances.

References

Unincorporated communities in Camden County, Missouri
Unincorporated communities in Missouri